Other Press is an independent publisher of literary fiction and nonfiction, based in New York City.  Founded in 1998 to publish academic and psychoanalytic titles, Other Press has since expanded to publish novels, short stories, nonfiction, poetry, and memoirs. Dedicated to publishing literature at its finest, Other Press emphasizes storytelling and exploring the limits of knowledge and imagination.

Books and authors
Other Press has published books by contemporary American authors as well as translated works from around the world. They publish books from a wide range of authors such as Simon Mawer, Hervé Le Tellier, Peter Stamm, Sarah Bakewell, Michael Greenberg, Ninni Holmqvist, Michael Crummey, Atiq Rahimi, Erri De Luca, Saleem Haddad, Bruce Bauman, and Alberto Moravia.

Some of their best-known titles include:
Simon Mawer, The Glass Room
Sarah Bakewell, How to Live (biography)
Michael Greenberg, Hurry Down Sunshine
Ninni Holmqvist, The Unit
Michael Crummey, Galore
Kamel Daoud,  The Meursault Investigation
Sarah Bakewell, At the Existentialist Cafe

References

External links
Other Press official website

Book publishing companies based in New York (state)
Publishing companies established in 1998